HMS Pembroke was a 60-gun fourth-rate ship of the line of the Royal Navy, launched at Deptford on 22 November 1694.

Pembroke was captured by French warships in the Mediterranean in 1709, recaptured in 1711, and finally sold to Spain in Genoa in 1713 and renamed Lanfranco. She saw action in the Siege of Barcelona under D. Andrés del Pez and participated in the expeditions to Genoa in 1714, to Majorca in 1715, and to South America in 1716. In 1718 she captured two French privateer frigates off Montevideo. She sank shortly after in Buenos Aires.

The Pembroke's bell

Since the 1960s, the bell from Pembroke has served as a church bell at St. Bride's Anglican church in the town of Otorohanga, New Zealand. It was given to the church on its construction by a local family, the Westmacotts, and it was used for every service.  The bell, which weighs 150 kg, was reported stolen from the church in the week beginning 13 June 2011.  The bell's clapper, which was removed between uses is still in the church's possession. The bell was found by scrap metal merchants and returned.

See also
List of ships captured in the 18th century

Notes

References

Lavery, Brian (2003) The Ship of the Line - Volume 1: The development of the battlefleet 1650-1850. Conway Maritime Press. .

Ships of the line of the Royal Navy
1690s ships
Maritime incidents in Argentina
Captured ships
Shipwrecks in rivers
Ships built in Deptford